In classical and quantum mechanics, geometric phase is a phase difference acquired over the course of a cycle, when a system is subjected to cyclic adiabatic processes, which results from the geometrical properties of the parameter space of the Hamiltonian. The phenomenon was independently discovered by S. Pancharatnam (1956), in classical optics and by H. C. Longuet-Higgins (1958)  in molecular physics; it was generalized by Sir Michael Berry in (1984). 
It is also known as the Pancharatnam–Berry phase, Pancharatnam phase, or Berry phase.
It can be seen in the conical intersection of potential energy surfaces and in the Aharonov–Bohm effect. Geometric phase around the conical intersection involving the ground electronic state of the C6H3F3+ molecular ion is discussed on pages 385–386 of the textbook by Bunker and Jensen. In the case of the Aharonov–Bohm effect, the adiabatic parameter is the magnetic field enclosed by two interference paths, and it is cyclic in the sense that these two paths form a loop. In the case of the conical intersection, the adiabatic parameters are the molecular coordinates. Apart from quantum mechanics, it arises in a variety of other wave systems, such as classical optics. As a rule of thumb, it can occur whenever there are at least two parameters characterizing a wave in the vicinity of some sort of singularity or hole in the topology; two parameters are required because either the set of nonsingular states will not be simply connected, or there will be nonzero holonomy.

Waves are characterized by amplitude and phase, and may vary as a function of those parameters. The geometric phase occurs when both parameters are changed simultaneously but very slowly (adiabatically), and eventually brought back to the initial configuration. In quantum mechanics, this could involve rotations but also translations of particles, which are apparently undone at the end. One might expect that the waves in the system return to the initial state, as characterized by the amplitudes and phases (and accounting for the passage of time). However, if the parameter excursions correspond to a loop instead of a self-retracing back-and-forth variation, then it is possible that the initial and final states differ in their phases. This phase difference is the geometric phase, and its occurrence typically indicates that the system's parameter dependence is singular (its state is undefined) for some combination of parameters.

To measure the geometric phase in a wave system, an interference experiment is required. The Foucault pendulum is an example from classical mechanics that is sometimes used to illustrate the geometric phase. This mechanics analogue of the geometric phase is known as the Hannay angle.

Berry phase in quantum mechanics 
In a quantum system at the n-th eigenstate, an adiabatic evolution of the Hamiltonian sees the system remain in the n-th eigenstate of the Hamiltonian, while also obtaining a phase factor.  The phase obtained has a contribution from the state's time evolution and another from the variation of the eigenstate with the changing Hamiltonian. The second term corresponds to the Berry phase, and for non-cyclical variations of the Hamiltonian it can be made to vanish by a different choice of the phase associated with the eigenstates of the Hamiltonian at each point in the evolution.

However, if the variation is cyclical, the Berry phase cannot be cancelled; it is invariant and becomes an observable property of the system. By reviewing the proof of the adiabatic theorem given by Max Born and Vladimir Fock, in Zeitschrift für Physik 51, 165 (1928), we could characterize the whole change of the adiabatic process into a phase term. Under the adiabatic approximation, the coefficient of the n-th eigenstate under adiabatic process is given by

where  is the Berry's phase with respect to parameter t. Changing the variable t into generalized parameters, we could rewrite the Berry's phase into

where  parametrizes the cyclic adiabatic process. Note that the normalization of  implies that the integrand is imaginary, so that  is real. It follows a closed path  in the appropriate parameter space.

Examples of geometric phases

The Foucault pendulum 

One of the easiest examples is the Foucault pendulum. An easy explanation in terms of geometric phases is given by Wilczek and Shapere: 

To put it in different words, there are no inertial forces that could make the pendulum precess, so the precession (relative to the direction of motion of the path along which the pendulum is carried) is entirely due to the turning of this path. Thus the orientation of the pendulum undergoes parallel transport. For the original Foucault pendulum, the path is a circle of latitude, and by the Gauss–Bonnet theorem, the phase shift is given by the enclosed solid angle.

Polarized light in an optical fiber 

A second example is linearly polarized light entering a single-mode optical fiber. Suppose the fiber traces out some path in space, and the light exits the fiber in the same direction as it entered. Then compare the initial and final polarizations. In semiclassical approximation the fiber functions as a waveguide, and the momentum of the light is at all times tangent to the fiber. The polarization can be thought of as an orientation perpendicular to the momentum. As the fiber traces out its path, the momentum vector of the light traces out a path on the sphere in momentum space. The path is closed, since initial and final directions of the light coincide, and the polarization is a vector tangent to the sphere. Going to momentum space is equivalent to taking the Gauss map. There are no forces that could make the polarization turn, just the constraint to remain tangent to the sphere. Thus the polarization undergoes parallel transport, and the phase shift is given by the enclosed solid angle (times the spin, which in case of light is 1).

Stochastic pump effect 

A stochastic pump is a classical stochastic system that responds with nonzero, on average, currents to periodic changes of parameters.
The stochastic pump effect can be interpreted in terms of a geometric phase in evolution of the moment generating function of stochastic currents.

Spin  

The geometric phase can be evaluated exactly for a spin- particle in a magnetic field.

Geometric phase defined on attractors 

While Berry's formulation was originally defined for linear Hamiltonian systems, it was soon realized by Ning and Haken that similar geometric phase can be defined for entirely different systems such as nonlinear dissipative systems that possess certain cyclic attractors. They showed that such cyclic attractors exist in a class of nonlinear dissipative systems with certain symmetries.

Exposure in molecular adiabatic potential surface intersections 

There are several ways to compute the geometric phase in molecules within the Born–Oppenheimer framework. One way is through the "non-adiabatic coupling  matrix" defined by

where  is the adiabatic electronic wave function, depending on the nuclear parameters . The nonadiabatic coupling can be used to define a loop integral, analogous to a Wilson loop (1974) in field theory, developed independently for molecular framework by M. Baer (1975, 1980, 2000). The D-matrix is given by

(here  is a path-ordering symbol). It can be shown that once  is large enough (i.e. a sufficient number of electronic states is considered), this matrix is diagonal, with the diagonal elements equal to  where  are the geometric phases associated with the loop for the -th adiabatic electronic state.

For time-reversal symmetrical electronic Hamiltonians the geometric phase reflects the number of conical intersections encircled by the loop. More accurately,

where  is the number of conical intersections involving the adiabatic state  encircled by the loop 

An alternative to the D-matrix approach would be a direct calculation of the Pancharatnam phase. This is especially useful if one is interested only in the geometric phases of a single adiabatic state.

In the limit  one has (see Ryb & Baer 2004 for explanation and some applications)

Geometric phase and quantization of cyclotron motion 

An electron subjected to magnetic field  moves on a circular (cyclotron) orbit. Classically, any cyclotron radius  is acceptable. Although the derivation of these results is not difficult, there is an alternative way of deriving them, which offers in some respect better physical insight into the Landau level quantization. This alternative way is based on the semiclassical Bohr–Sommerfeld quantization condition

which includes the geometric phase  picked up by the electron while it executes its (real-space) motion along the closed loop of the cyclotron orbit. For free electrons,  while  for electrons in graphene.

See also 
 Riemann curvature tensor – for the connection to mathematics
 Berry connection and curvature
 Chern class
 Optical rotation
 Winding number

Notes 
 For simplicity, we consider electrons confined to a plane, such as 2DEG and magnetic field perpendicular to the plane.

Footnotes

Sources 

 
 
  (See chapter 13 for a mathematical treatment)
 Connections to other physical phenomena (such as the Jahn–Teller effect) are discussed here: Berry's geometric phase: a review
 Paper by Prof. Galvez at Colgate University, describing Geometric Phase in Optics: Applications of Geometric Phase in Optics 
 Surya Ganguli, Fibre Bundles and Gauge Theories in Classical Physics: A Unified Description of Falling Cats, Magnetic Monopoles and Berry's Phase
 Robert Batterman, Falling Cats, Parallel Parking, and Polarized Light 
 
 M. Baer, Electronic non-adiabatic transitions: Derivation of the general adiabatic-diabatic transformation matrix, Mol. Phys. 40, 1011 (1980);
 M. Baer, Existence of diabetic potentials and the quantization of the nonadiabatic matrix, J. Phys. Chem. A 104, 3181–3184 (2000).

Further reading
 Michael V. Berry, The geometric phase, Scientific American 259 (6) (1988), 26–34.

External links
 
 

Classical mechanics
Quantum phases